Khorgist 
 Khorgist District
 Khorgam Rural District